Kamila Barbosa Vito da Silva (born 13 September 1988) is a Brazilian freestyle wrestler. She is a two-time bronze medalist at the Pan American Wrestling Championships. She also represented Brazil at the Pan American Games in 2015 and in 2019.

Career 

In 2019, she represented Brazil at the World Beach Games in Doha, Qatar and she won the gold medal in the women's 50 kg beach wrestling event.

At the 2020 Pan American Wrestling Championships held in Ottawa, Canada, she won one of the bronze medals in the 50 kg event. She also competed in the 2020 Pan American Wrestling Olympic Qualification Tournament, also held in Ottawa, Canada, without qualifying for the 2020 Summer Olympics in Tokyo, Japan. She also failed to qualify for the Olympics at the World Olympic Qualification Tournament held in Sofia, Bulgaria.

In 2021, she won one of the bronze medals in the women's 50 kg event at the Pan American Wrestling Championships held in Guatemala City, Guatemala. In October 2021, she was eliminated in her first match in the women's 50 kg event at the World Wrestling Championships held in Oslo, Norway.

In 2022, she competed in the 50 kg event at the Yasar Dogu Tournament held in Istanbul, Turkey. She competed in the 50kg event at the 2022 World Wrestling Championships held in Belgrade, Serbia.

Achievements

References

External links 

 

Living people
1988 births
Place of birth missing (living people)
Brazilian female sport wrestlers
Pan American Games competitors for Brazil
Wrestlers at the 2015 Pan American Games
Wrestlers at the 2019 Pan American Games
Pan American Wrestling Championships medalists
21st-century Brazilian women